Kot na Pohorju is a dispersed settlement in the Municipality of Slovenska Bistrica in northeastern Slovenia. It lies in the Pohorje Hills north of Oplotnica. The area is part of the traditional region of Styria. It is now included with the rest of the municipality in the Drava Statistical Region.

It was the location of fighting during the Second World War and a granite memorial to the Partisan brigades that fought there was erected on the site in 1965.

References

External links
Kot na Pohorju at Geopedia

Populated places in the Municipality of Slovenska Bistrica